Ozarba hemiochra is a moth of the family Noctuidae first described by George Hampson in 1910. It is found in South Africa.

References

Endemic moths of South Africa
Acontiinae